The following is a list of bolides and fireballs seen on Earth in 2017. These are small asteroids (known as meteoroids) that regularly impact the Earth. Although most are so small that they burn up in the atmosphere before reaching the surface, some larger objects may reach the surface as fragments, known as meteorites.

Meteors with a recorded absolute magnitude are then converted to an asteroidal absolute magnitude under (Ma = Mm + 31) and then converted to a diameter assuming that meteoroids brighten by approximate 10 magnitudes when entering the atmosphere. Objects reported only to the American Meteor Society are only listed if observed by at least 10 people, and are cross-referenced with https://fireballs.ndc.nasa.gov if possible, to determine further physical characteristics. The fourth and third to last parameters are calculated from http://convertalot.com/asteroid_impact_calculator.html, assuming a density of 1.5 g/cm3, an impact angle of 45°, and a velocity of 17 km/s (if not provided). The actual values for both may vary by as much as the value itself, so be aware that these values are only estimates.

List

December

November

October

September

August

July

June

May

April

March

February

See also
List of bolides
Impact event
List of meteor air bursts

Notes

References

bolides
2017
2017
2017
bolides